Edward Abel Joyal (born May 8, 1940) is a Canadian former professional ice hockey centre who played in the National Hockey League (NHL) with the Detroit Red Wings, Los Angeles Kings, and Philadelphia Flyers between 1963 and 1972. He also played in the World Hockey Association (WHA) with the Alberta Oilers/Edmonton Oilers between 1972 and 1976.

Early life
Born in St. Albert, Alberta, Joyal learned to play ice hockey on a frozen river downhill from his home. When healthy, he impressed with the Edmonton Oil Kings of the WCJHL. He scored 84 points in two seasons when he was restricted to 58 games due to injuries.

Career 
Joyal signed on with the Detroit Red Wings and began his pro career with the Edmonton Flyers of WHL in 1960–61. After scoring 37 goals in 1961–62, he was elevated to the Pittsburgh Hornets of the AHL the next season and scored ten points in 14 games for the Detroit Red Wings. Joyal suited up for 47 games the next year and helped the Wings reach the 1964 Stanley Cup Finals. His winning goal against Toronto Maple Leafs' Johnny Bower gave his team a 3–2 edge in a series they failed to close out. Joyal played one more season in Detroit before being traded to the Toronto Maple Leafs where he played in 14 games during 1965–66.

NHL expansion gave Joyal's career new life. He was claimed by the Los Angeles Kings and went on to enjoy four and a half impressive years on the West Coast. He hit the 20-goal mark three times including a career-high 33 goals in 1968–69. He was traded along with Ross Lonsberry, Bill Flett and Jean Potvin from the Kings to the Flyers for Serge Bernier, Bill Lesuk and Jim Johnson on January 28, 1972. He was a role player with the Flyers for the rest of the season.

After being chosen in the WHA General Player Draft, Joyal played four years with the Edmonton Oilers. He scored 22 goals twice and helped his team make the playoffs in 1973–74.

Career statistics

Regular season and playoffs

References

External links
 

1940 births
Living people
Calgary Stampeders (WHL) players
Canadian expatriate ice hockey players in the United States
Canadian ice hockey centres
Detroit Red Wings players
Edmonton Flyers (WHL) players
Edmonton Oil Kings (WCHL) players
Edmonton Oilers (WHA) players
Ice hockey people from Alberta
Los Angeles Kings players
Philadelphia Flyers players
Pittsburgh Hornets players
Rochester Americans players
Sportspeople from St. Albert, Alberta
Toronto Maple Leafs players
Tulsa Oilers (1964–1984) players